Hieu was a 7th-century Irish abbess who worked in Northumbria. She was foundress of abbeys at Hartlepool and Healaugh in Yorkshire England. Hieu was also the first of the saintly recluses of Northumbria, and the first known woman to rule a double monastery.

Life 
Nothing is known of her early life, until she met Aidan of Lindisfarne who appointed her abbess of Hartlepool Abbey and subsequently a monastery at Healaugh near Tadcaster.

She died at Healaugh on 12 March of an unknown year in the 7th century. It is possible that the towns of Hartlepool (Hereteu) and Healaugh are named after her.

Hieu's memorial is kept on September 2.

References

External links
 

Year of birth unknown
Year of death unknown
7th-century births
7th-century Christian saints
7th-century English people
7th-century English women
7th-century Irish abbots
7th-century Irish nuns
Anglo-Saxon nuns
Anglo-Saxon abbesses
Benedictine nuns
Christian female saints of the Middle Ages
English hermits
Irish hermits
Northumbrian saints